This article details the qualification procedures, formats and/or phases of the 2022 CAF Women's Champions League.

The qualification phases were made up of 6 sub-confederation qualifying tournaments which commenced on 7 August 2022 within COSAFA for Southern Africa and the CECAFA  for mostly East Africa and a bit of Central Africa. Qualification ended on 16 September 2022 with the participating teams reduced to the final 8 which were made up of one winning team each from the 6 CAF sub-confederations (WAFU is split into two zones), the tournament's defending champions and the host nation's league-winning team. champions. These 8 teams would proceed to the main tournament, which will be held across two stadiums in Morocco.

Participating teams
All participating teams qualified for the qualification phase via winning their respective national league titles and had their club licensing applications accepted by CAF. A total of 33 (out of 54) countries have a participant club in this edition.

Associations which did not enter a team

(W)

Main Qualification Phase
Each of CAF's sub-confederations held a qualifying tournament, starting with COSAFA for South Africa and CECAFA for mostly East Africa and a bit of Central Africa. A single winner of each sub-confederation qualification tournament would advance to the final tournament where they would be joined by the host nation's league champions .

UNAF

The UNAF qualification tournament was held from 14 to 20 August 2022 in Agadir, Morocco.

WAFU Zone A

The tournament took place in Paynesville, Liberia.

WAFU Zone B

Seven clubs competed for this year's qualification tournament which was held in Yamoussoukro, Ivory Coast, from 20 August to 2 September 2022. having been originally scheduled for hosting in Abidjan.

Group stage

Group B

Knockout stage

Semi-finals

Third place

Final

UNIFFAC

The tournament was originally to be held from 20 August to 4 September 2022 in Yaoundé, Cameroon, with two-legged ties for the semi-finals. Due to the lack of guarantee from the Cameroonian government, Equatorial Guinea was announced as the new host on 24 August which ran from 10 to 26 September 2022, disqualifying Cameroonian club, AS AWA, in the process.

Round 1

Semi-finals

Final

CECAFA

The CECAFA qualification tournament was held from 14 to 27 August in Dar es salaam, Tanzania, having initially been scheduled from 28 July to 10 August 2022 in Arusha, Tanzania.

Group stage

Group A

Group 2

Knockout stage

Semi-finals

Third place

Final

COSAFA

The draw for the qualification tournament for COSAFA teams (branded as the COSAFA Women's Champions League) was held in South Africa from 7 to 14 August 2022. The six teams were divided into two groups of three with the top two in each group advancing to the semi-finals.

Group stage

Group 1

Group 2

Knockout stage

Third place

Final

References

External links
2022 CAF Women's Champions League – CAFOnline.com

 
2022
Women's Champions League
2022 in women's association football